Claudio Jonatan Vargas (born 8 August 1996) is an Argentine professional footballer who plays as a centre-back for Huracán.

Career
Vargas' career started with Huracán. He was an unused substitute at senior level in May 2017 for a Copa Sudamericana fixture with Deportivo Anzoátegui, though wasn't subbed on by manager Juan Manuel Azconzábal in a 4–0 victory. On 30 June 2018, Vargas agreed a loan move to Primera B Metropolitana's Sacachispas. He made his first senior appearances in the succeeding August, appearing in fixtures with San Miguel and Almirante Brown. He featured a total of fifteen times for them, twelve of which were as a starter.

Career statistics
.

References

External links

1996 births
Living people
Place of birth missing (living people)
Argentine footballers
Association football defenders
Primera B Metropolitana players
Club Atlético Huracán footballers
Sacachispas Fútbol Club players